FBP: Federal Bureau of Physics was an American comic book series by Simon Oliver and Robbi Rodriguez, distributed by Vertigo Comics. FBP imagines a world where disturbances in the laws of physics are as common as weather, and necessitate forecasts about wormhole locations, momentary gravity losses, and entropy reversals. With much fanfare, the government creates a new bureaucratic organization to deal with quantum disturbances, the Federal Bureau of Physics. The story follows special agent Adam Hardy as he deals with internal departmental battles and increasingly dangerous and radical quantum disasters.

Original title
Oliver and Rodriguez originally meant for the title of FBP: Federal Bureau of Physics to be Collider. While Vertigo distributed the first issue under Collider, beActive, an Irish comic press, took legal action and forced Vertigo to change the title. While Oliver said he was ambivalent about changing the name, the process of creating a new title allowed the creative team an opportunity to "really get back examine to the nuts and bolts, and kick the tires of what the book's really all about".

In other media
In 2014, Warner Bros. was in development of a film version of FBP with Justin Marks penning the script, while produced by David S. Goyer and Nellie Reed.

Collected editions

References

Vertigo Comics titles
Science fiction comics